Warpaint Live is a live album by American southern rock band The Black Crowes, released on April 28, 2009. This is the first Black Crowes live album since Freak 'n' Roll in 2006 and it features live versions of the whole Warpaint album. Recorded live on March 20, 2008 at The Wiltern in Los Angeles, CA. The double CD precedes the release of the live concert DVD later in 2009.

Track listing
All songs written by Chris Robinson and Rich Robinson, except where noted.

Disc one
 "Goodbye Daughters of the Revolution" – 5:20
 "Walk Believer Walk " – 4:55
 "Oh, Josephine" – 7:59
 "Evergreen" – 4:21
 "Wee Who See the Deep" – 7:35 
 "Locust Street" – 4:14
 "Movin' On Down the Line" – 7:58
 "Wounded Bird" – 4:39
 "God's Got It" (Reverend Charlie Jackson) – 4:26
 "There's Gold in Them Hills" – 5:04
 "Whoa Mule" – 6:53

Disc two
 "Poor Elijah – Tribute to Johnson" (Delaney Bramlett, Jim Ford, Leon Russell) – 5:52
 "Darling of the Underground Press" – 4:25
 "Bad Luck Blue Eyes Goodbye" – 7:56
 "Don't Know Why" (Bonnie Bramlett, Eric Clapton) – 5:17
 "Torn and Frayed" (Mick Jagger, Keith Richards) – 5:16
 "Hey Grandma" (Jerry Miller, Don Stevenson) – 4:13

References 

The Black Crowes live albums
2009 live albums
Albums recorded at the Wiltern Theatre
Eagle Records live albums